MTV Sub (formerly TVTV!, Subtv and Sub) is a Finnish TV channel owned by MTV Oy. The previous owner Alma Media sold Sub and its sister channels (MTV3, C More Max, MTV Ava Radio Nova and Sävelradio) to Swedish Bonnier and Proventus in 2005.

Programs and audience
Sub is an entertainment channel directed at teens and young adults. Programs are mostly imported and of U.S. origin. Sub also shows reruns of popular and cult TV shows. Recently, the share of domestic programming has grown remarkably.

The channel's highest viewership of all time was attracted in 2009, when the finale of Big Brother 2009 was aired.

Programming

Subteksti 
Subteksti was Sub's teletext service. It contained music news, TV schedules and interactive services like chats and mobile phone games and services.

References

External links 
Brief introduction to Sub in English

Television channels in Finland
Bonnier Group
Television channels and stations established in 1999
1999 establishments in Finland